A Velvet Elvis is a painting of Elvis Presley on velvet. It typically represents a costumed torso of Elvis holding a microphone, painted on black velvet (or velvet of some other dark color, such as navy blue, red or purple). This iconic velvet painting is considered an archetypical example of kitsch.

A brief history of black velvet paintings is presented by Pamela Liflander in Black Velvet Artist, a booklet published by Running Press, Philadelphia in 2003, and included in an art kit by the same name. Liflander also details the life of Edgar Leeteg, "the father of American black velvet kitsch," whose "raucous and bawdy" life was previously captured by James Michener in Rascals in Paradise (1957).

Velvet was a popular medium for artists on the streets of Tijuana, reaching a height of popularity in the 1970s.

Cultural references

Songs
Songs directly about the paintings include:
"Velvet Elvis" by STIR
"Velvet Elvis" by Dry Cell
"Velvet Elvis" by Ralston Bowles
"Black Velvet" by Alannah Myles 
"Velvet Elvis" by Alex Winston
"Velvet Elvis" by "Weird Al" Yankovic, a whimsical ode to such a painting, in a pastiche of the musical style of The Police
"Velvet Elvis" by Adrenalin O.D.
"Elvis" by Sister Hazel
"Elvis On Velvet" by the Stray Cats, about the intense commercialization of Elvis following his death, suggesting that "The King" would find such items (particularly the paintings) disrespectful
"Velvet Elvis" by Kacey Musgraves
"Velvet Elvis" by Pink Lincolns
"Velvet Elvis" by Cary Hudson

Video games
An entire level of the video game Psychonauts, known as Black Velvetopia, is dedicated to such velvet paintings.
In the PC game Fallout, a Velvet Elvis portrait can be found in the crashed UFO encounter, on an alien skeleton. In its sequel, Fallout 2, it can be found in several locations. This refers to the rumors and jokes that Elvis is still alive and living with aliens.
A Velvet Elvis can also be found in the PC game Fountain of Dreams in the Desoto's compound. It is the only type of painting that cannot be sold to Big Daddy for money.

Other
 The Velvet Elvis is a 2012 Amazon Studios Test Movie about a black Elvis impersonator/demon hunter who is forced to put down his guitar and pick up his gun when a string of murders threaten to unleash hell on earth.
Hampshire College students had a tradition regarding a Velvet Elvis which was to be stolen by successive students, who would display it in a common area in their homes from where it could be stolen again.
Velvet Elvis: Repainting the Christian Faith is a book written by Rob Bell of Mars Hill Bible Church, inspired by a velvet Elvis painting in his garage. While in college as the lead singer of _ton bundle, he wrote a song called "Velvet Elvis", inspired by the same painting.

References

Visual arts genres
Cultural depictions of Elvis Presley